Chlorobotrys is a genus of algae belonging to the family Chlorobothryaceae.

The species of this genus are found in Europe.

Species:
 Chlorobotrys regularis (W.West) Bohlin, 1901

References

Ochrophyta
Heterokont genera